The electricity sector of Armenia includes several companies engaged in electricity generation and distribution. Generation is carried out by multiple companies both state-owned and private.

As of 2016, the majority of the electricity sector is privatized and foreign-owned (by Russian and American companies), which is the result of a law passed in 1998 allowing for the privatization of electricity generation and distribution in the country. Administration, government legislation, and policy of the sector is conducted by the Ministry of Energy Infrastructures and Natural Resources of Armenia. Regulation of the sector is performed by the Public Services Regulatory Commission of Armenia.

Armenia does not have any fossil-fuel reserves, so it relies on gas imports from Russia and Iran, and nuclear fuel imports from Russia, which, together, result in approximately 66% of electricity production. Armenia is a net-producer of electricity and has exported in excess of 1.3 billion kWh per year since 2014 to Iran, Georgia, and Artsakh.

Large investments have been made in the electricity sector in Armenia in 2000's. These include the construction of the $247M combined-cycle Yerevan Thermal Power Plant completed in 2010, a $52M loan from the World Bank in 2015 to improve the reliability of electricity distribution across Armenia, and a $42M investment in 2016 by Electric Networks of Armenia to repair distribution networks.

In June 2016, the Armenian Parliament updated the law “On Energy Saving and Renewable Energy” which encourages the use of solar power in the country and allows users of solar installations of 150 kW or less to sell their excess energy back to the electrical grid.

The voltage in Armenia is 220 V AC at a frequency of 50 Hz. Armenia uses the European 2-pin C-socket and F-socket plugs.

Installed capacity for electricity generation  

According to International Energy Agency in 2015 electricity generation in Armenia increased since 2009 to nearly 8000 GWh, but still remains below 1990 levels. Also, in 2015 Armenia consumed more than twice as much natural gas than in 2009.

Armenia lacks fossil energy source, and heavily relies on the production of electricity from a nuclear power plant and hydro power plants, and uses imported fossil fuels to operate thermal power plants. Solar energy and wind energy productions are just a small portion of the overall electricity production.

Out of 3213.2 MW of installed capacity in Armenia, the largest portion of electricity generation comes from Metsamor Nuclear Power Plant at 38%, 33% from hydro power plants, 22% from thermal power plants, and the remaining 7% from other renewable sources. Similar figures are derived from reports published by Electric Networks of Armenia - during the period of 01.01.2012 - 30.06.2017 breakdown of aggregated electricity supply was: ANPP - 35.8%, all HPPs - 35.6%, all TPPs - 28.5%.

The base loaded capacity is provided by the Metsamor Nuclear Power Plant, while the daily load regulation is provided by both the Sevan-Hrazdan Cascade and the Vorotan cascade hydropower plants. The aforementioned power plants are the primary domestic production energy sources while thermal power plants depend on imported gas.

Nuclear power 

Nuclear power provides 38% of the electricity in Armenia through one operating nuclear reactor, Unit 2 of Metsamor Nuclear Power Plant, which is a WWER-440 reactor with extra seismic reinforcement. It was created in 1976 and is the only nuclear power plant in the South Caucasus. However, after the Spitak earthquake in 1988, the nuclear power plant's operation was forced to stop, becoming one of the causes of the Armenian energy crisis of 1990's. The second unit of the NPP was restarted in October 1995, putting an end to the 'dark and cold years'.

Nuclear fuel must be flown in from Russia. While Armenia is the sole owner of the plant, the Russian company United Energy Systems (UES) manages the Metsamor NPP.

A modernization of NPP is scheduled for 2018, which will enhance the safety and increase installed capacity by 40-50 MW.

Armenia also explores the possibilities of small modular reactor that would give flexibility and the opportunity to build a new nuclear power plant in a short time.

Earlier it was reported that Armenia is looking for a new reactor with 1060 MW capacity in 2026.

Thermal power

History 
From the 1960s, the USSR carried out an electricity generation plan with the intention of constructing thermal power plants in the southern regions of Armenia where fossil fuel energy resources were restricted. Construction of thermal power plants started in the energy-intensive regions of Armenia. The first power plant was constructed in Yerevan in 1960, which was followed by Vanadzor Thermal Power Plant in 1961, and Hrazdan Thermal Power Plant in 1963.

The main source of energy for these power plants was natural gas which was delivered through pipelines running from Turkmenistan through Azerbaijan. Until the late 1980s, Armenia was heavily dependent on thermal and nuclear energy production. During the years of the first Nagorno-Karabakh War, the energy production of the thermal power plants was also stopped because of a border blockade, and Armenia had a severe energy crisis until the mid-1990s. However, Armenia managed to overcome this crisis. Although most of the technology of some of the thermal power plants is outdated as of December 2016, a lot of upgrades and maintenance have been undertaken on the power plants. The Vanadzor Thermal Power Plant is not operational as of December 2016.

Current situation 
There are two operational thermal power plants as of December 2016: The Hrazdan Thermal Power Plant with an installed capacity of 1100 MW, and the Yerevan Thermal Power Plant with an installed capacity of 250 MW. The 5th unit of the Hrazdan TPP with installed capacity of 450 MWt was commissioned on December 2, 2013. Hrazdan Thermal Power Plant, which is owned by the Russian Federation, produced 12.3% of the electricity produced in Armenia in 2014.

Recent upgrades made to the Yerevan Thermal Power Plant have increased its efficiency to almost 70% by reducing the consumption of fuel, sulfuric acid, and caustic soda, and by reducing emission levels. For its power production, it uses natural gas supplied from Iran and exchanges it with the electricity produced by the plant, while using the surplus energy for domestic consumption. On November 29, 2021 a new combined heat and gas power plant with installed capacity of 250 MW was launched in Yerevan.

Renewable energy resources and installations
Armenia does not possess large fossil energy resources like coal, gas, or oil. However, according to a report by the Danish Management Group, Armenia has a large potential for renewable energy.

Armenia has set a target to generate 26% of its domestic power from renewable resources by 2025.

Hydro power 
Hydro power plants provide 70 percent of Armenia's renewable energy, and 33% of the country's overall electricity production. Major HPP capacities are installed within Sevan-Hrazdan Cascade and Vorotan Cascade. The hydropower potential of Armenia is reported to be 21.8 billion kWh.

As of the 1 January 2018, electricity was generated by 184 small HPPs, with total installed capacity of 353 MW.  In 2017 the generation of the electricity from small HPPs was around 862 million kW*h, which is about 11% of the total generated electricity in Armenia (7762 million kW*h). As of 1 January 2018, and according to the provided licenses, 36 additional SHPPs are under construction, with about total projected 69 MW capacity and 250 million kW*h electricity annual supply.

Solar energy 

Solar energy potential in Armenia is 1000 MW according to researchers. The reason for this is that average solar radiation in Armenia is almost 1700 kWh/m2 annually. Currently, the solar technology is used only by some companies, and has no wide use among the citizens of Armenia. One of the well-known utilization examples is the American University of Armenia (AUA) which uses it not only for electricity generation, but also for water heating. The Government of Armenia is promoting utilization of solar energy.

In 2018 the amount of solar power produced in Armenia increased by nearly 50 per cent. Government figures show that Armenia's solar power average is 60 per cent better than the European average.

As of April 2019 ten 1 MW strong solar stations are installed. Solar and wind stations account for ess than 1% of total installed electricity generation capacities.

In March 2018 an international consortium consisting of the Dutch and Spanish companies won the tender for the construction of a 55 MW solar power plant Masrik-1. The solar power station is planned to be built in the community of Mets Masrik of the Gegharkunik region entirely at the expense of foreign investments. The expected volume of investments in this generation facility will be about $50 million. Construction of the plant was expected to be completed by 2020. In May 2019 the deadline for start of financing the Masrik-1 solar power plant  construction project has been extended by 198 days.

In April 2019 it was announced that German company Das Enteria Solarkraftwerk will build a 2 MW strong solar station near Shorzha at lake Sevan by end of 2020.

Wind power

Bioenergy 
The bioenergy sphere is gradually developing in Armenia. There are three rudimentary branches of bio energy: biofuel, biomass and biogas. Many scientists see the future of renewable energy of Armenia in bio energy.

The first is biofuel. As is accepted worldwide, the substantial sources of bio-ethanol are corn and sugarcane. Through these ingredients, bio ethanol is generated. Even in the case of blending it 50–50 with oil, the price will be cheaper than in ordinary cases. Thus, prices for transportation will decrease as well. The weather in Armenia is not appropriate for growing sugarcane, so the Jerusalem artichoke is considered to replace it. Moreover, its high concentration of carbohydrates makes it a better source for bio-ethanol production. Another type of cheap biofuel is created by compressing straw, sawdust, and the pods of sunflowers in a crusher into granules, which are then burned. It is feasible to receive 2 cubic meters (m3) of gas from the burning of 1 kilogram (kg) of those granules. Scientists believe this will give Armenia the opportunity to provide heat for houses and to produce electricity, which would not be dependent on gas pipes or oil.

The second one is biomass. Scientists share the opinion that Armenia has the most energy-diverse market in the Caucasus. The reason for this is that, in addition to gas and electricity used for heating, people from many towns and villages use biomass, such as wood and manure. Thus biomass pellets have large prospective as they burn cleaner, hotter, and are more conventional.

Biogas yielded from manure can be a good source for generating both heat and electricity. An example of this in Armenia is Lusakert Biogas Plant in Nor Geghi, Kotayk Marz. It was built in 2008, and is still working properly with a nominal capacity of 0.85 MW. After being built, the power plant won a National Energy Globe Award.

Electricity consumption 

According to Armstat total final consumption of electric energy in 2016 amounted to 458.2 ktoe and was broken down as presented on the graph to the right.

In 2014, Armenia consumed 5352 GWh of the total 7956 GWh of electricity production (7750 GWh domestic production and 206 GWh imports). This is approximately 67.3% of the total. The biggest consumer was the residential sector (1924 GWh, ~24.2%).

World Bank data referring to International Energy Agency demonstrates that in per capita terms electricity consumption in Armenia remains below world average and in 2014 only matched 1992 figure.

Electricity transmission and distribution 
Distribution is controlled by Electric Networks of Armenia (ENA), High Voltage Electrical Networks (HVEN CJSC), and Electro Power System Operator. There are over 36,000 km of distribution lines across Armenia.

In 2002, Electric Networks of Armenia (ENA) was privatized by Midland Resources Holding. 100% of ENA shares were sold to Midland Resources Holding company. Revenues of Electric Networks of Armenia amounted to 181 billion AMD in 2018, less from 191 billion in 2017.

Transmission and distribution losses remain high in Armenia, even compared to Russia.

A World Bank survey from 2013 reveals companies would experience a power outage only about 4 times a year (at par with countries like Hungary and Latvia).

Financial aspects

Supplier tariffs 

Electricity supplier prices are determined by the Settlement Center of Ministry of Energy Infrastructures and Natural Resources of Armenia.

Solar installations of 150 kW or less are allowed to sell their excess energy back to the electrical grid.

In February 2018 Armenian parliament adopted a set of amendments and additions to the Law on Energy and a number of related laws, designed to liberalize the national energy 

market, specify the functions of responsible government agencies and those of the regulator and protect the interests of consumers.

In the reports published by Electricity Networks of Armenia can be seen, that Yerevan Thermal Power Plant, which is modernized with a funding from Japan and European technologies, is much more energy-efficient than old Thermal Power Plant in Hrazdan and sells electricity to the grid at twice as lower price (15.5 AMD vs. 25 / 31 AMD) is not utilized to its full capacity.  Rather, more electricity is acquired from less efficient TPPs in Hrazdan, owned by Gazprom and Tashir Group, and selling electricity at higher prices, which leads to overall higher prices and increased consumer prices.  Here shall be noted that Electricity Networks of Armenia are also owned by Tashir Group.

Supplier tariffs are more favorable for producers of electricity from renewable sources. At the beginning of 2019 rates (excluding VAT) are:

 Electricity tariff for power supplied from SHPP  that are built on natural water streams is 23.805 AMD / kW·h 
 Electricity tariff for power supplied from SHPP  that are built on irrigation systems is 15.867 AMD / kW·h
 Electricity tariff for power supplied from SHPP  that are built on natural drinking sources is 10.579 AMD / kW·h
 Electricity tariff for power supplied from wind farm is 42.739 AMD / kW·h
 Electricity tariff for power generated from biomass is 42.739 AMD / kW·h
 Electricity tariff for power generated from solar photovoltanic installation is 42.739 AMD / kW·h

Consumer tariffs and billing 

Electricity tariffs are dependent on the time of day (night/day), and the voltage supplied to the customer. Tariffs are determined by the Public Services Regulatory Commission of Armenia while wholesale prices are determined by the Settlement Centre CJSC and submitted to Electric Networks of Armenia.

There were protests (Electric Yerevan) from June to September 2015 over a price increase for electricity, which was increased by 6.93 AMD per kilowatt-hour (AMD/kWh) (~US$0.015/kWh) to 39.78 AMD/kWh (~US$0.0830). After protests prices were decreased from August 1, 2016, by 2.58 AMD/kWh (~US$0.0054) from 48.78 AMD/kWh (~US$0.1018) to 46.2 AMD/kWh (~US$0.0964).

By the end of December 2018 further decrease of tariffs by 10.01 AMD per kWh for socially insecure population was announced.

Subsidies 
Depending on the amount of electricity consumed, the Government of Armenia subsidizes electricity bills of consumers who utilize less than 500 kWh of electricity per month.

Billing 
Customers are billed monthly in kWh. Bills can be paid at physical locations such as Haypost (the Armenian post office), banks, payment terminals, and electronically via mobile apps, SMS, and via the Internet.

Funding 
ENA's benefit (Electric Networks of Armenia) from low-rate state-loans amounted to 3.77 billion AMD in 2018 and 4.0 billion AMD in 2019.

ENA received a loan from the World Bank in 2016 to pay debts owed to electricity producing companies in Armenia, primarily the Metsamor Nuclear Power Plant and the Yerevan Thermal Power Plant.

Future plans and investments 

There are numerous investment opportunities in the sector as Armenia has significant potential for electricity production from renewable energy sources such as hydropower, wind, solar, geothermal, and biogas.

Nuclear energy 
Metsamor nuclear power plant provides more than 40 percent of power in Armenia; however, it is aging and will need to be replaced soon. It has received much financing for modernizing its systems and safety features. Russia has extended a loan of $270 million and a $30 million grant for extending the lifetime of Metsamor NPP in 2015, which will be coming to an end in 2016. The funds are to be provided for 15 years with a 5-year grace period and an interest rate of annually 3%.

Plans for building a new nuclear power plant have been discussed. In July 2014, the energy minister of Russian Federation announced that Russia is willing to provide US$4.5 billion out of US$5 billion needed for construction of a new nuclear power plant. In 2014, the construction of a new power plant was approved by the Armenian government, which was to be started in 2018.

Hydro energy 
Hydro power is the most widely used renewable energy source in Armenia since Soviet times. Armenian government has proposed construction of four large and 30 small hydroelectric plants with a combined 300 MW capacity.

These include:

 Meghri HPP on Araks River in Syunik Province (revised to about 100 MW capacity and around 800 million kWh; corresponding law enacted in Iran in 2017; earlier cost estimates run at $323 million), 
 Shnogh HPP on Debed River in Lori Province (about 75 MW capacity and 300 million kWh annual electricity generation) and 
 Loriberd HPP on Dzoraget River in Lori Province (about 66 MW capacity and 200 million kWh annual electricity generation) 

The cost of the project is at least US$500 million and is currently proposed for investment.

Solar energy 
Armenia also has a large solar energy potential. Compared with other countries, the average annual energy flow is higher; therefore, there is large interest in this energy sector.

In May 2018 deputy minister of energy infrastructure and natural resources mentioned that the electricity market liberalization process began and a local production of solar panels kicked off.  He said that it is planned to make the solar energy share reach at least 10% in the energy sector by 2022.  314 solar power stations with up to 500 kW capacity are connected to the electricity network in Armenia, while 85 other solar power stations are in the stage of connection with a total capacity of 5.2 MW. 4 systemic solar stations are connected to the network, 7 are in the construction phase with completion planned within this year with the total capacity is 10 MW. Nearly 600 families are already using solar energy in non-gasified communities under state funded projects alone.

In July 2015, a US$58 million investment project was launched, which was designed to help the renewable energy sector. This project included plans for solar power stations of 40-50 MW capacity.

In April 2019 it was announced that German company Das Enteria Solarkraftwerk will build a 2 MW strong solar station near Shorzha at lake Sevan by end of 2020.

Geothermal energy 
As of 2018, the Ministry of Energy and Natural Resources of Armenia is considering the development of a geothermal plant on the Jermaghbyur and Karkar sites in a package solution with a single investor.

An $8.55M grant was awarded by the World Bank in 2015 for further exploration of geothermal resources in Armenia.

Reconnaissance drilling for Armenia's first geothermal power plant in Jermaghbyur (Jermaghbyur Geothermal Power Plant) was conducted in 2016. The drilling works of the first wells with the depth of 1500m and the second well of 1682m have been completed. The total cost of the geothermal power plant construction project at Karkar site is expected to make about $100 million. Karkar geothermal power plant with a capacity of 30 MW will generate around 250 million kWh of electricity in a year.

A high pressure (20-25 atmosphere pressure) hot water (up to 250 °C) considered to be available in depth of 2500–3000 meters in Jermaghbyur is a potential source of geothermal energy with a capacity of 25 MW.

Energy efficiency 
In 2012, US$1.82 million was invested by International Bank of Reconstruction and Development in an energy saving program. The program planned to upgrade the insulation of public buildings and heating systems, which included replacing traditional lamps with LEDs, and installing solar water heating panels. On 30 June 2016 the project's grant component had been completed.

See also 

 Electric Yerevan
 Energy in Armenia

Notes

References

External links 
Ministry Of Energy Infrastructures and Natural Resources Of Armenia
Public Services Regulatory Commission of Armenia
Armenia Renewable Resources and Energy Efficiency Fund
Electric Networks of Armenia
Hrazdan Energy Company
Vorotan Armenia
“International Energy Corporation” CJSC

Electric power in Armenia
Armenia
Armenia
Energy in Armenia